Rossa is a municipality in the Moesa Region in the canton of Graubünden in Switzerland. Its official language is Italian.

History
Rossa is first mentioned in 1694.

Geography

Of this area, 9.1% is used for agricultural purposes, while 40.8% is forested. Of the rest of the land, 0.4% is settled (buildings or roads) and the remainder (49.7%) is non-productive (rivers, glaciers or mountains).

Before 2017, the municipality was located in the Calanca sub-district of the Moesa district, after 2017 it was part of the Moesa Region.  It is the highest municipality of Val Calanca.

Demographics
, 10.7% of the population was made up of foreign nationals. Over the last 10 years the population has decreased at a rate of -14.4%. Most of the population speaks Italian (84.1%), with German  being second most common (11.4%) and French being third ( 3.0%).

, the gender distribution of the population was 50.4% male and 49.6% female.  The age distribution, in Rossa is; 5 children or 3.8% of the population are between 0 and 9 years old.  6 teenagers or 4.5% are 10 to 14, and 2 teenagers or 1.5% are 15 to 19.  Of the adult population, 11 people or 8.3% of the population are between 20 and 29 years old.  9 people or 6.8% are 30 to 39, 23 people or 17.4% are 40 to 49, and 19 people or 14.4% are 50 to 59.  The senior population distribution is 17 people or 12.9% of the population are between 60 and 69 years old, 22 people or 16.7% are 70 to 79, there are 14 people or 10.6% who are 80 to 89, and there are 4 people or 3.0% who are 90 to 99.

In the 2007 federal election the most popular party was the SP which received 37.2% of the vote.  The next two most popular parties were the SVP (21.5%) and the FDP (20.2%).

In Rossa about 69.3% of the population (between age 25-64) have completed either non-mandatory upper secondary education or additional higher education (either university or a Fachhochschule).

Rossa has an unemployment rate of 2.22%.  , there were 4 people employed in the primary economic sector and about 3 businesses involved in this sector.  6 people are employed in the secondary sector and there are 2 businesses in this sector.  8 people are employed in the tertiary sector, with 4 businesses in this sector.

The historical population is given in the following table:

References

External links
Official website 

 
Municipalities of Graubünden